Sergio Santimaria (born 26 April 1957 in Vigevano) is an Italian former cyclist.

Major results
1981
2nd Trofeo Matteotti
1982
2nd Gran Premio Città di Camaiore
1983
2nd GP Industria & Artigianato di Larciano
1984
1st Stage 14 Giro d'Italia
1986
1st Stage 1 Giro d'Italia

References

1957 births
Living people
Italian male cyclists
People from Vigevano
Cyclists from the Province of Pavia